María Martha Celestina Eva Laguette Lardizábal (born 14 February 1951) is a Mexican lawyer and politician currently affiliated with National Regeneration Movement. She was a federal deputy from the Institutional Revolutionary Party in the LIX Legislature of the Mexican Congress representing Chihuahua.
In 2017, seeking a Senate candidacy that did not pan out, Laguette switched parties to Morena. In January 2019, she was named the head of finances for the state Morena party in Chihuahua.

References

1951 births
Living people
People from Chihuahua City
20th-century Mexican lawyers
Women members of the Chamber of Deputies (Mexico)
Institutional Revolutionary Party politicians
Mexican women lawyers
Morena (political party) politicians
Members of the Chamber of Deputies (Mexico) for Chihuahua (state)